Jack Simpson may refer to:

Jack Simpson (footballer) (born 1997), English footballer
Jack Simpson (politician) (1929–2015), Australian politician and footballer
Jack Simpson (cricketer) (1920–1997), Irish cricketer
Jack Simpson (golfer) (1859–1895), Scottish golfer
John Simpson Kirkpatrick (1892–1915), Australian soldier who served as John (Jack) Simpson
Jack Simpson (racing driver) in 1973 NASCAR Winston Cup Series
Jack Simpson (ice hockey) from 1938 Memorial Cup
Jack Simpson (motorcyclist) from 1963 Grand Prix motorcycle racing season
Jack Simpson (rugby league) Australian rugby league player from 1930s; killed in WW2
Jack Simpson (sailor) from 29er
Jack Simpson (Prison Fellowship) from Reconciliation, Tolerance, and Unity Bill

See also
Jack Simpson Gymnasium, Calgary
Jackie Simpson (disambiguation)
John Simpson (disambiguation)
Jock Simpson (1886–1959), English footballer